Largus davisi is a species of bordered plant bug in the family Largidae. It is found in North America.

References

External links

 

Largidae
Articles created by Qbugbot
Insects described in 1914